Scott James Fiti (born 17 July 1995) is a Micronesian sprinter who represented the Federated States of Micronesia at the 2020 Summer Olympics.

He represents Chuuk State.
Fiti finished in 5th place for the men's 100m in qualification heat 3 in the 2019 IAAF World Championships in Doha running 11.34 seconds.

After being chosen for the 2020 Summer Games, he was given the honour of being the flag bearer for the nation in the opening ceremony.

References

External links
 

1995 births
Living people
Federated States of Micronesia male sprinters
Athletes (track and field) at the 2020 Summer Olympics
Olympic track and field athletes of the Federated States of Micronesia
People from Tamuning, Guam